Bogdănești is a commune in Vaslui County, Western Moldavia, Romania. It is composed of nine villages: Bogdănești, Buda, Horoiata, Hupca, Orgoiești, Ulea, Unțești, Vișinari and Vlădești.

References

Communes in Vaslui County
Localities in Western Moldavia